The Gorno-Altai Autonomous Soviet Socialist Republic was an autonomous republic of the Russian SFSR within the Soviet Union. It was formed on 1 June 1922 as the Oyrot Autonomous Region and became the Gorno-Altai Autonomous Oblast on 7 January 1948. It was upgraded to the level of Autonomous Soviet Socialist Republic on 25 October 1990, and was declared a Soviet Socialist Republic on 3 July 1991, although it was not recognised as one. It became the Altai Republic on 31 March 1992. Its capital was Gorno-Altaysk. Agriculture is the main occupation for most of the inhabitants. Like the modern Altai Republic, the Gorno-Altai ASSR shared its international border with the People's Republic of China.

The Russian Soviet Federative Socialist Republic and some of the other republics also contained administrative subdivisions with boundaries drawn according to nationality or language. The three kinds of such subdivisions included twenty autonomous republics, eight autonomous oblasts, and ten autonomous okruga.

History
From 1922 to 1947 Gorno-Altai was called the Oyrot Autonomous Oblast. It was renamed to the Gorno-Altai Autonomous Oblast in 1948 and was renamed again to the Gorno-Altai Autonomous Soviet Socialist Republic in 1990. It was renamed to the Gorno-Altai Republic on 3 July 1991 and became the Altai Republic on 31 March 1992. It is now a federal subject of the Russian Federation.

When the region became the Oyrot Autonomous Region in 1922, the region's capital was originally called Ulala. In 1928 Ulala was renamed to Oyrot-Tura in 1932. However, in 1948 the state changed the name of the region to the Gorno-Altai Autonomous Oblast. With it, Ulala was again renamed, this time to Gorno-Altaysk.

Education
The Gorno-Altaisk State University was founded in 1949, with only 10 teachers. In 1993 it became a classical university.

Demographics

Ethnic groups
The 1989 census states that ethnic Russians make up 60.4% of Gorno-Altai's population, with the ethnic Altai people at 31.0%. Other groups include Kazakhs (5.6%) and several smaller groups, accounting for less than 5% of the population when put together. Comparing it to the 2002 census, the ethnic Altais have significantly increased in numbers.

Religion
Some Altai people converted to Christianity, but in 1904 a new religion, Burkhanism (the "white faith"), had pervaded the community of native Altaians. Burkhanism helped to encourage anti-Russian feelings and was consequently banned by the Communist Party in the 1930s.

Government
This table includes the heads in the time period of Gorno-Altai being an ASSR.

See also
First Secretary of the Gorno–Altai Communist Party

References

Politics of the Altai Republic
Former socialist republics
1990 establishments in the Soviet Union
1992 disestablishments in Russia
Autonomous republics of the Russian Soviet Federative Socialist Republic
History of the Altai Republic